Barış Özbek (born 14 September 1986) is a German former professional footballer who played as a midfielder.

Club career
Özbek cemented his spot as a solid regular starter at Galatasaray in his first season and won the league title with his club. At the start of the 2009–10 season, he scored a brace during the third qualifying round of the Europa League, against Maccabi Netanya on 6 August 2009. He adopted the nickname Barış for his commitment when it comes to chasing the ball.

In June 2011, he left Galatasaray to join league rivals Trabzonspor.

In January 2015 Özbek joined Kayserispor from Union Berlin.

Özbek moved to MSV Duisburg on 1 February 2016. In November 2017, he agreed to the termination of his contract.

By April 2022, Özbek had retired from professional playing.

International career
Born to Turkish parents in Germany, Özbek has a German passport and played for the Germany under-21 national team.

Personal life
His brother, Ufuk is also a professional footballer.

Career statistics

Honours
Galatasaray
Süper Lig:  2007–08
Türkiye Süper Kupası: 2008

References

Barış Özbek, Kayserispor'dan ayrıldı, ulke.com.tr, 7 January 2016

External links

Living people
1986 births
People from Castrop-Rauxel
Sportspeople from Münster (region)
German people of Turkish descent
Turkish footballers
German footballers
Footballers from North Rhine-Westphalia
Association football midfielders
Germany youth international footballers
Germany under-21 international footballers
SG Wattenscheid 09 players
Rot-Weiss Essen players
Galatasaray S.K. footballers
Trabzonspor footballers
1. FC Union Berlin players
Kayserispor footballers
MSV Duisburg players
Fatih Karagümrük S.K. footballers
Süper Lig players
2. Bundesliga players
3. Liga players